In 2013, renewable energy provided 26.44% of the total electricity in the Philippines and 19,903 gigawatt-hours (GWh) of electrical energy out of a total demand of 75,266 gigawatt-hours. 
The Philippines is a net importer of fossil fuels. 
For the sake of energy security, there is momentum to develop renewable energy sources. 
The types available include hydropower, geothermal power, wind power, solar power and biomass power. 
The government of the Philippines has legislated a number of policies in order to increase the use of renewable energy by the country.

The government has committed to raising to 50% the contribution of renewables of its total electricity generating capacity, with 15.3 gigawatts (GW) by 2030. 
The move would help the country in its commitment to reduce its carbon emissions by 70% by 2030.

Background 
There is momentum to decrease reliance on fossil fuels due to the negative effects such as pollution, climate change and financial uncertainty because of fluctuating fuel prices. 
Legislation passed by the Congress of the Philippines to support the use of renewable energy include the Electric Power Industry Reform Act (2001); the Biofuels Act (2006), which encourages the use of biomass fuels; the Renewable Energy Act (2008); and the Climate Change Act (2009), which provides a legal basis for addressing climate change through sustainable development.

Renewable energy implementation is important to the Philippines for several reasons. The geographic characteristics of the country make it vulnerable to the adverse effects of climate change. Rising sea levels are a threat because the Philippines is an archipelago with many cities located in coastal areas. As the coastline recedes due to rising seas, coastal cities become vulnerable to flooding. Climate change has also been linked to changing weather patterns and extreme weather events.

Reliance on fossil fuels is detrimental to the energy security of the Philippines. The Philippines is a net importer of fossil fuels. In 2012, the Philippines imported 20 million tons of coal. Eight million tons were produced domestically. In 2010, the Philippines imported 54 million barrels of oil and produced 33,000 barrels. Given this dependence on imported coal and oil, the Philippines is vulnerable to price fluctuations and supply constraints.

The Philippine Department of Energy wrote:“The harnessing and utilization of renewable energy comprises a critical component of the government's strategy to provide energy supply for the country. This is evident in the power sector where increased generation from geothermal and hydro resources has lessened the country's dependency on imported and polluting fuels. In the government's rural electrification efforts, on the other hand, renewable energy sources such as solar, micro-hydro, wind and biomass resources are seeing wide-scale use.”

Sources 
The Philippines utilizes renewable energy sources including hydropower, geothermal and solar energy, wind power and biomass resources. In 2013, these sources contributed 19,903 GWh of electrical energy, representing 26.44 percent of the country's electricity needs. Among the renewable energy sources available in the country, geothermal shows to be the cheapest and most (economically) attractive energy source followed by wind, hydropower, and lastly, solar PV.

Hydroelectric plants 
Hydropower is one of the main sources of renewable energy in the Philippines. There are hydroelectric plants of both the conventional dam and run-of-the-river types in the country. Of twenty-nine hydroelectric plants, fourteen are conventional dam and fifteen are run-of-the-river systems. Hydropower accounts for 11.8% of the energy generation and 17-18% of installed capacity in the Philippines.

Many areas of the Philippines are suitable for hydroelectricity production. However, hydroelectricity production in the Philippines can cause upstream and downstream flooding during monsoonal weather and when excess water is released from dams. Hydropower integration also has the potential to disturb pre-existing natural ecosystems and cultures as well as cause land dispossession and community resettlement. The methods of using geographic information system (GIS) and remote sensing (RS) to determine suitable sites for constructing hydroelectric plants do not tend to incorporate social or environmental considerations. In response to the construction of large scale hydroelectric infrastructure, opposition movements have arisen. Anti-dam organizations and protests may advocate for indigenous peoples, environmental conservation, anti-capitalism, or anti-imperialism. Vocal environmental human rights defenders have been red-tagged by the government or extra-judicially killed by the military or police. The rights, concerns, and political agency of indigenous peoples trying to protect their villages and sacred sites from being submerged have often been disregarded due to urban-centric economic development.

Incorporating small scale plants, especially micro-hydroelectric plants that have a capacity of less than 0.1 MW (100 kW), may mitigate adverse side effects and be a cost-effective way to bring electricity to rural and off-the-grid communities.Isolated mountain communities have seen improvements in education, community engagement, and economy due to improved lighting provided by micro-hydropower.

Geothermal power 

 
In the Philippines, geothermal energy is used to generate electricity. Two types of technologies are used in the Philippines. These are firstly, the higher temperature flash steam method and secondly, the lower temperature binary cycle method. In the Philippines, the first is the more common. The second is used only at the MAKBAN plant. Geothermal plants are suitable for areas with low winds, such as Mindanao, and areas that have rainy weather, such as Batanes. Geothermal energy production can result in the release of toxic substances such as mercury, hydrogen sulfide, arsenic and selenium. In 2014, at a geothermal plant in Biliran, eight plant workers were hospitalized with hydrogen sulphide poisoning.

Solar power 

In 2015, three solar farms were constructed in the Philippines. The Philippines receives over 7kWh per square meter per day during its peak month of April and lowest at 3kWH per square meter per day during its off-peak month of December as observed by Schadow1 Expeditions in 33 cities of the country. Given the country's high solar potential, the solar energy's contribution to the energy mix is expected to increase from the current (2019) 1.2% of 23GW to at least 3.5% of the 43GW total capacity by 2040.

Wind power 

All wind power sites in the Philippines are on-shore facilities. Some, such as Ilocos Norte, Pililla Wind Farm in Rizal and Bangui Wind Farm are tourist destinations.

Biomass power 

Biomass energy refers to energy derived from plant and animal sources. Biomass resources are abundant in the Philippines due to its large agricultural industry. Bagasse, rice husks, and coconut husks are used to generate power. The Philippines also uses Biogas from landfill as a biomass energy source. The availability of biomass can be affected by events such as drought.|

Legislation 
The Philippine government has passed four laws that seek to improve the state of renewable energy. These are the Electric Power Industry Reform Act of 2001 (RA 9136); the Biofuel Act of 2006 (RA 9367); the Renewable Energy Act of 2008 (RA 9513); and the Climate Change Act of 2009 (RA 9729).

The Electric Power Industry Reform Act (2001) (EPIRA) promotes the use of  renewable energy particularly through private sector investment. However, after a decade of EPIRA's enactment, advocacy groups and lawmakers said the law only strengthened monopolies and caused electricity rates to double.

The Biofuels Act (2006) documents state policy to reduce the Philippines' dependence on imported fossil fuels. It encourages investment in biofuels through incentives including reduced tax on local or imported biofuels; and bank loans for Filipino citizens engaged in biofuel production. The law resulted in the formation of the National Biofuel Board (NBB).

The Renewable Energy Act (2008) legislates state policy to accelerate the development and use of renewable energy resources. Under this act (section 6), mandated a minimum percentage of generation of electricity from renewable sources (a renewable portfolio standard (RPS)). Also under this act (section 7), a feed-In tariff system was implemented for electricity produced from renewable sources, giving producers the security of long term fixed prices. Electricity utilities make net metering agreements with qualified end-users of renewable energy systems. A minimum percentage of electricity from renewable sources for the off-grid missionary electrification system was also mandated.

Under the Renewable Energy Act (2008) incentives are available to developers of renewable energy. These incentives include an income tax holiday for the first seven years of the entity's commercial operations; duty-free importation and special realty tax rates on renewable energy machinery, equipment and materials within the first ten years; net operating loss carry-over; zero percent Value-Added Tax (VAT) rate for the sale of fuel or power generated from renewable sources of energy; and Tax Credit on domestic capital equipment and services.

The Climate Change Act (2009) legislated state policy to incorporate a gender-sensitive, pro-children and pro-poor perspective in all climate change and renewable energy efforts.

Feed-in tariff program statistics

Private sector involvement 
The Renewable Energy Act (2008) encourages the involvement of the private sector in renewable energy production through fiscal and non-fiscal incentives.

Fiscal incentives include tax reductions, as well as funding assistance from both government and third parties. A number of international organizations have expressed willingness to aid Philippine businesses in developing local renewable energy infrastructure including German Technical Cooperation (GTZ), United States Agency for International Development (USAID), Asian Development Bank (ADB), United Nations Development Programme (UNDP), and Japan International Cooperation Agency (JICA). Impediments to private sector investment include high transaction costs; social engineering costs; lack of suitable local technology; and caps on electricity prices made by the Energy Regulatory Commission.

Public-private partnership 
Up until June 2015, the Department of Energy (DOE) had awarded 646 service contracts as Public-private partnerships to private sector entities under the Renewable Energy Law with installed capacity of 2,760.52 MW.

Instances of private sector projects include:

*—off grid project

See also
 Electricity sector in the Philippines
 Energy in the Philippines
 Geothermal power in the Philippines
 Wind power in the Philippines

References